Helicogorgia is a genus of corals belonging to the family Chrysogorgiidae.

The species of this genus are found in Southern Africa.

Species:

Helicogorgia capensis 
Helicogorgia flagellata 
Helicogorgia ramifera 
Helicogorgia spiralis 
Helicogorgia squamifera

References

Chrysogorgiidae
Octocorallia genera